Chinese drama may refer to:

 Theatre of China
 Chinese-language cinema:
 Cinema of China
 Cinema of Hong Kong
 Cinema of Taiwan
 Chinese literature
 Chinese television drama

See also
 Chinese theatre (disambiguation)